Ellie Hack (born 12 June 2002) is an English professional footballer who plays as a defender for Lewes of the FA Women's Championship.

Club career

Brighton & Hove Albion 
Part of the Brighton & Hove Albion Dual Career Academy system, Hack was introduced into the first team during the 2018–19 season. She made her senior debut on 10 January 2019 as a 59th-minute substitute to replace Danielle Buet in a 7–1 defeat against Manchester City in the League Cup quarter-final. On 27 January 2019, she made her league debut in a 3–0 away defeat to the same opposition. During the 2019–20 season Hack continued to play for the club's academy team, making 15 appearances in addition to one senior appearance, again in the League Cup.

Loan to Lewes 
On 7 August 2020, Hack was loaned to Championship side Lewes ahead of the 2020–21 season.

International career 
In April 2016, Hack captained the England Schools' under-15 girls at the Bob Docherty Cup, an annual home nations tournament. England won the tournament without conceding a goal, winning both group stage games against Wales and Scotland before beating the Republic of Ireland in the final.

In September 2018, Hack was called up to the England U17 squad for the first round of 2019 UEFA Women's Under-17 Championship qualifiers against Moldova, Azerbaijan and Iceland. Hack made her under-17 debut in the first game against Moldova, coming on in the 83rd minute for Keri Mathews in a 6–0 win. Hack started the following game against Azerbaijan and scored England's final goal in a 7–0 win. Hack later played in the subsequent elite round as England qualified as group 1 winners and was called up to the 2019 UEFA Women's Under-17 Championship squad in May 2019, making one appearance in a 2–1 group stage victory over Austria.

Career statistics

Club
.

References

External links
 

Living people
2002 births
English women's footballers
Women's Super League players
Brighton & Hove Albion W.F.C. players
Women's association football defenders
Lewes F.C. Women players
Women's Championship (England) players
England women's youth international footballers